Eureka! Science + Discovery is a  tourist attraction in Seacombe, Wallasey, Merseyside, North West England. Set to open on 11 November 2022, the attraction's main topic of interest is STEAM education (Science, Technology, Engineering, Arts, Maths) through playful learning. Suited to visitors aged 0–14.

The building used for the attraction was previously Spaceport and was opened on 26 July 2005 by Merseytravel Chairman Mark Dowd. The previous attraction was based around learning about space through interactive exhibits. A visit to the centre took about two hours, which included half an hour spent in the Spacedome planetarium. This section of the attraction was on the ground floor at the back of the building. Visitors to Spaceport could also take a River Explorer Cruise on a Mersey Ferry.

In July 2019 Merseytravel announced that spaceport was to close, due to a decline in visitor numbers and the attraction becoming too costly to run following government funding cuts. It was announced that the building would become another attraction, the £14m "Eureka! Science + Discovery"  Centre. Merseytravel will still own the building, and the new company will operate the attraction.

References

External links
Spaceport - official site

Museums in Merseyside
Science centres in England
Buildings and structures in the Metropolitan Borough of Wirral
Aerospace museums in England
Wallasey